The Montagu Butler Library is one of the world’s major collections in and about Esperanto, having 4433 items in its detailed catalogue.

It is named after Montagu C. Butler, author of a number of works including Step by Step in Esperanto and the comprehensive Esperanto-English Dictionary.

It is housed in purpose-built premises at the offices of the Esperanto Association of Britain which are now located at the Wedgwood Memorial College, Barlaston, Stoke-on-Trent, Staffordshire, having moved from Holland Park, London in April 2001 due to financial pressures.

For details of other major collections consult Esperanto library.

External links

 Esperanto Association of Britain
 Montagu Butler Library
 Catalogue

Buildings and structures in Stoke-on-Trent
Esperanto libraries
Libraries in Staffordshire
Esperanto in the United Kingdom